Crowding out can refer to: 

 Crowding out (biology) 
 Crowding out (economics), concerning government intervention
 Motivation crowding theory, in psychology and microeconomics